Jacob Worth (May 1, 1838 – February 21, 1905) was an American politician from New York.

Life
He was born on May 1, 1838, in New York City. The family removed to Williamsburgh in 1842. His father died a short time later, leaving a widow and five children in straitened circumstances. He began to work aged eight years in a ropewalk. At age 14, he became a teamster on the Erie Canal, then a boatman on the Hudson River, and aged 16 joined the U.S. Navy as an apprentice, and made a voyage around the world which lasted three years. After his return to Brooklyn he worked as a rigger.

At age 19, he entered politics as a Democrat, but in 1861 became a Republican. In September 1862, he was commissioned a first lieutenant in the 139th New York Volunteers, and early in 1863 a captain in the 84th New York Volunteers, and fought in the Peninsular Campaign until the latter part of 1863.

Worth was a member of the New York State Assembly (Kings Co., 7th D.) in 1864, 1865 and 1866. In November 1866, he ran for Brooklyn Street Commissioner, but was defeated. He was again declared elected to the 91st New York State Legislature (Kings Co., 6th D.), and took his seat at the beginning of the session, but his election was contested by Democrat John Raber who was seated on March 13, 1868.

He was again a member of the State Assembly (Kings Co., 6th D.) in 1873, 1874, 1875, 1876 and 1878. In November 1878, he ran for Sheriff of Kings County, but was defeated. He was a Commissioner of City Works of Brooklyn from 1879 to 1880, and was appointed Brooklyn Fire Commissioner in 1880. In 1884, he ran unsuccessfully for Congress.

He was a member of the New York State Senate (4th D.) from 1886 to 1889, sitting in the 109th, 110th, 111th and 112th New York State Legislatures.

In 1897, he was appointed Clerk of Kings County, to fill a vacancy. The same year he supported Seth Low at the first mayoral election of the consolidated City of New York, against the regular Republican candidate Benjamin F. Tracy, and fell in disgrace with the Republican party machine.

Worth suffered from poor health after 1898, and during his last years spent the winters in Hot Springs, Arkansas. On February 21, 1905, a short time after returning from the Oaklawn Park Race Track, he died suddenly in his room at the Eastman Hotel in Hot Springs, "supposedly of heart failure."

Sources
 The New York Red Book compiled by Edgar L. Murlin (published by James B. Lyon, Albany NY, 1897; pg. 403, 487–490, 494–498 and 783)
 Life Sketches of Government Officers and Members of the Legislature of the State of New York in 1875 by W. H. McElroy and Alexander McBride (pg. 319ff)
 Biographical sketches of the members of the Legislature in The Evening Journal Almanac (1887)

References

1838 births
1905 deaths
Republican Party New York (state) state senators
People from Williamsburg, Brooklyn
Republican Party members of the New York State Assembly
Union Army officers
19th-century American politicians